On 5 December 1791, the composer Wolfgang Amadeus Mozart died at his home in Vienna, Austria at the age of 35. The circumstances of his death have attracted much research and speculation.

The principal sources of contention are:
 Whether Mozart declined gradually, experiencing great fear and sadness, or whether he was fundamentally in good spirits toward the end of his life, then felled by a relatively sudden illness;
 Whether the cause of his death was from disease or poisoning;
 Whether his funeral arrangements were the normal procedures for his day, or whether they were of a disrespectful nature.

There are a range of views on each of these points, many of which have varied radically over time.

The course of Mozart's final illness

Traditional narrative

Mozart scholarship long followed the accounts of early biographers, which proceeded in large part from the recorded memories of his widow Constanze and her sister Sophie Weber as they were recorded in the biographies by Franz Niemetschek and Georg Nikolaus von Nissen. For instance, the important biography by Hermann Abert largely follows this account. The following is a summary of this view.

When in August 1791 Mozart arrived in Prague to supervise the performance of his new opera La clemenza di Tito (K. 621), he was "already very ill". During this visit, Niemetschek wrote, "he was pale and expression was sad, although his good humour was often shown in merry jest with his friends." Following his return to Vienna (mid September 1791), Mozart's condition gradually worsened. For a while, he was still able to work and completed his Clarinet Concerto (K. 622), worked toward the completion of his Requiem (K. 626), and conducted the premiere performance of The Magic Flute (K. 620) on 30 September. Still, he became increasingly alarmed and despondent about his health. An anecdote from Constanze is related by Niemetschek:

Constanze attempted to cheer her husband by persuading him to give up work on the Requiem for a while, encouraging him instead to complete the "Freimaurerkantate" (K. 623), composed to celebrate the opening of a new Masonic temple for Mozart's own lodge. The strategy worked for a time – the cantata was completed and successfully premiered on 18 November. He told Constanze he felt "elated" over the premiere. Mozart is reported to have stated, "Yes I see I was ill to have had such an absurd idea of having taken poison, give me back the Requiem and I will go on with it."

Mozart's worst symptoms of illness soon returned, together with the strong feeling that he was being poisoned. He became bedridden on 20 November, suffering from swelling, pain and vomiting.

From this point on, scholars are all agreed that Mozart was indeed very sick, and he died about two weeks later, on 5 December.

Revisionist accounts
The view that Mozart was in near-steady decline and despair during the last several months of his life has been met with much skepticism in recent years. Cliff Eisen supervised the reissue of Abert's biography in 2007 in a new edition, supplementing it with numerous footnotes. While generally deferential to Abert, Eisen expresses sharp criticism in the footnoting of the section leading up to Mozart's death:

In the main biography article of the Cambridge Mozart Encyclopedia, Ruth Halliwell writes of the decline-and-despair account:

As for why Constanze might have been "prompted by complicated motives both personal and financial" (Eisen), Halliwell contends that "Constanze and Sophie were not objective witnesses, because Constanze's continuing quest for charity gave her reasons to disseminate sentimental and sensationalist views." By "charity" Halliwell may be referring to the many benefit concerts from which Constanze received income in the years following Mozart's death, as well as, perhaps, the pension she received from the Emperor; see discussion below as well as Constanze Mozart.

Christoph Wolff, in a 2012 book entitled Mozart at the Gateway to his Fortune, disputes the view that Mozart's last years represented a steady slide to despair and the grave; he also disagrees with interpretations of the music as reflecting late-life despair (for example) "the hauntingly beautiful autumnal world of [Mozart's] music written in 1791".

Cause of death

Theories involving homicide
An early rumor was that Mozart had been poisoned by his colleague Antonio Salieri; however, this has been proved untrue because the symptoms displayed by Mozart's illness did not indicate poisoning. Despite denying the allegation, Salieri was greatly affected by the accusations and widespread public belief that he had contributed to Mozart's death, which contributed to his nervous breakdowns in later life.

Beyond the Salieri theory, other theories involving murder by poison have been put forth, blaming the Masons, Jews, or both. One such theory was the work of Mathilde Ludendorff, wife of the German general Erich Ludendorff (who were both anti-Semitic). Historian William Stafford describes such accounts as outlandish conspiracy theories.

Theories involving disease
Stafford described the effort to determine what disease killed Mozart:

In the parish register, the entry concerning Mozart's death states he died of "severe miliary fever" – "miliary" referring to the appearance of millet-sized bumps on the skin. This does not name the actual disease.

Mozart had health problems throughout his life, suffering from smallpox, tonsillitis, bronchitis, pneumonia, typhoid fever, rheumatism, and gum disease. Whether these played any role in his demise cannot be determined.

Conjectures as to what killed Mozart are numerous. The following survey is arranged in rough chronological order.

Some ascribe Mozart's death to malpractice on the part of his physician, Dr. Closset. His sister-in-law Sophie Weber, in her 1825 account, makes the implication. Borowitz summarizes:

A 1994 article in Neurology suggests Mozart died of a subdural hematoma. A skull believed to be Mozart's was saved by the successor of the gravedigger who had supervised Mozart's burial, and later passed on to anatomist Josef Hyrtl, the municipality of Salzburg, and the Mozarteum museum (Salzburg). Forensic reconstruction of soft tissues related to the skull reveals substantial concordance with Mozart's portraits. Examination of the skull suggested a premature closure of the metopic suture, which has been suggested on the basis of his physiognomy. A left temporal fracture and concomitant erosions raise the question of a chronic subdural hematoma, which would be consistent with several falls in 1789 and 1790 and could have caused the weakness, headaches, and fainting Mozart experienced in 1790 and 1791. Additionally, an episode of aggressive bloodletting used to treat suspected rheumatic fever on the night of December 4, 1791, could have decompensated such a lesion, leading to his death on the following day.

In a 2000 publication, a team of two physicians (Faith T. Fitzgerald, Philip A. Mackowiak) and a musicologist (Neal Zaslaw) reviewed the historical evidence and tentatively opted for a diagnosis of rheumatic fever.

The hypothesis of trichinosis was put forth by Jan V. Hirschmann in 2001.

A suggestion is that Mozart died as a result of his hypochondriasis and his predilection for taking patent medicines containing antimony. In his final days, this was compounded by further prescriptions of antimony to relieve the fever he clearly suffered.

A 2006 article in a UK medical journal considered several theories for Mozart's death and, based on his letters from his last year, dismisses syphilis and other chronic diseases. The attending physicians wrote he died with fever and a rash, and a physician they consulted wrote later "this malady attacked at this time a great many of the inhabitants and not for a few of them it had the same fatal conclusions and the same symptoms as in the case of Mozart." The article's conclusion was "death came as a result of an acute infectious illness."

In 2009, British, Viennese and Dutch researchers performed epidemiological research combined with a study of other deaths in Vienna at the time of Mozart's death. They concluded that Mozart may have died of a streptococcal infection leading to an acute nephritic syndrome caused by poststreptococcal glomerulonephritis. In Austria this disease was also called "Wassersucht" (dropsy/edema).

In a journal article from 2011, it was suggested that Vitamin D deficiency could have played a role in Mozart's underlying medical conditions leading to his death.

Funeral
The funeral arrangements were made by Mozart's friend and patron Baron Gottfried van Swieten. Describing his funeral, the Grove Dictionary of Music and Musicians states, "Mozart was buried in a common grave, in accordance with contemporary Viennese custom, at the St. Marx Cemetery outside the city on 7 December." Otto Jahn wrote in 1856 that Salieri, Süssmayr, van Swieten and two other musicians were present.

The common belief that Mozart was buried in a pauper's grave is without foundation. The "common grave" referred to above is a term for a grave belonging to a citizen not of the aristocracy. It was an individual grave, not a communal grave; but after ten years the city had the right to dig it up and use it for a later burial. The graves of the aristocracy were spared such treatment.

A description of Mozart's funeral, attributed to Joseph Deiner, appeared in the Vienna Morgen-Post of 28 January 1856:

As Slonimsky notes, the tale was widely adopted and incorporated into Mozart biographies, but Deiner's description of the weather is contrary to records kept of the previous day. The diarist Karl Zinzendorf recorded on 6 December that there had been "mild weather and frequent mist". The Vienna Observatory kept weather records and recorded for 6 December a temperature ranging from 37.9 to 38.8 degrees Fahrenheit (2.8 °C–3.8 °C), with "a weak east wind at all ... times of the day".

Aftermath
Following her husband's death, Constanze addressed the issue of providing financial security for her family; the Mozarts had two young children, and Mozart had died with outstanding debts. She successfully appealed to the Emperor on 11 December 1791 for a widow's pension due to her as a result of Mozart's service to the Emperor as a part-time chamber composer. Additionally, she organized a series of concerts of Mozart's music and the publication of many of her husband's works. As a result, Constanze became financially secure over time.

Soon after the composer's death a Mozart biography was started by Friedrich Schlichtegroll, who wrote an early account based on information from Mozart's sister, Nannerl. Working with Constanze, Franz Niemetschek wrote a biography as well. Much later, Constanze assisted her second husband, Georg Nikolaus von Nissen, on a more detailed biography published in 1826. See Biographies of Mozart.

Mozart's musical reputation rose following his death; 20th-century biographer Maynard Solomon describes an "unprecedented wave of enthusiasm" for his work after he died, and a number of publishers issued editions of his compositions.

What may have been Mozart's skull was exhumed in 1801, and in 1989–1991 it was examined for identification by several scientists.

Remembrances of Mozart's death 

Individuals present at the time of Mozart's death eventually committed their memories to writing, either on their own or through interviews by others. The stories they told are often contradictory, which may be due in part to some of the events not being recorded until the 1820s, when the witnesses' memories might have faded.

Benedikt Schack, Mozart's close friend for whom he wrote the role of Tamino in The Magic Flute, told an interviewer that on the last day of Mozart's life, he participated in a rehearsal of the Requiem in progress. Schack's questionable account appeared in an obituary for Schack which was published in the 25 July 1827 issue of the Allgemeine musikalische Zeitung:

Biographer Niemetschek relates a vaguely similar account, leaving out a rehearsal:

The widely repeated claim that, on his deathbed, Mozart dictated passages of the Requiem to his pupil Süssmayr is strongly discounted by Solomon, who notes that the earliest reference for this claim dates to 1856. However, Süssmayr's handwriting is in the original manuscript of the Requiem and Sophie Weber did claim to recall that Mozart gave instructions to Süssmayr.

An 1840 letter from the composer Ignaz von Seyfried states that on his last night, Mozart was mentally occupied with the currently running opera The Magic Flute. Mozart is said to have whispered the following to Constanze in reference to her sister Josepha Hofer, the coloratura soprano who premiered the role of the Queen of the Night:

Solomon, while noting that Mozart's biographers often left out the "crueler memories" surrounding his death, stated, "Constanze Mozart told Nissen that just before the end Mozart asked her what [his physician] Dr. Closset had said. When she answered with a soothing lie, he said, 'It isn't true,' and he was very distressed: 'I shall die, now when I am able to take care of you and the children. Ah, now I will leave you unprovided for.' And as he spoke these words, 'suddenly he vomited —it gushed out of him in an arc— it was brown, and he was dead.'" Mozart's older, seven-year-old, son Karl was present at his father's death and later wrote, "Particularly remarkable is in my opinion the fact that a few days before he died, his whole body became so swollen that the patient was unable to make the smallest movement, moreover, there was stench, which reflected an internal disintegration which, after death, increased to the extent that an autopsy was impossible."

See also
List of unsolved deaths

Notes

References

 
  

Eisen, Cliff and Simon P. Keefe (2006) The Cambridge Mozart Encyclopedia.  Cambridge:  Cambridge University Press.

 See Wikisource for more versions.

Further reading

1791 in music
Death conspiracy theories
Deaths by person in Europe
Retrospective diagnosis
Unsolved deaths
Death